Joseph-Anne-Marie de Moyriac de Mailla (also Anna, and de Moyria)  (16 December 1669 – 28 June 1748) was a French Jesuit missionary to China.

Biography
Mailla was born at Château Maillac on the Isère.  After finishing his studies, he joined the Society of Jesus in 1686, and, in 1701, was sent on a mission to China as a member of the Jesuits. In June, 1703, Father Mailla arrived in Morocco and thence set out for Canton where he acquired a thorough knowledge of Chinese language and writing.

He devoted himself particularly to the study of Chinese historical works. When the Kangxi Emperor entrusted the Jesuit missionaries with the cartographical survey of his empire, the provinces of Henan, Zhejiang, and Fujian, and the Island of Formosa, fell to the lot of Mailla along with Jean-Baptiste Régis and Roman Hinderer. When the work had been completed, the emperor conferred on Father Mailla the rank of mandarin as a mark of his satisfaction.

When Father Mailla died, in his seventy-ninth year, in Beijing, China, he was buried at the expense of the Qianlong Emperor, many people being present at the obsequies.

Works
When he was fifty years old he began the study of the Manchu language, and made such progress that he was able to translate into French the "Thoung-kian-kang-mou", Zhu Xi's extract from the great Chinese annals, which on the orders of the Kangxi Emperor had been translated into the Manchu language.  He finished the translation in several volumes in the year 1730, and in 1737 sent it to France, where it lay for thirty years in the library of the college at Lyon, Fréret, who purposed publishing it, having died.

After the suppression of the Jesuit order, the college authorities gave the manuscript to the Abbé Grosier on condition that he would see to the publication of the work. Not long after, the work appeared under the title: "Histoire générale de la Chine, ou Annales de cet Empire; traduit du Tong-kien-kang-mou par de Mailla, Paris, 1777-1783", in 12 volumes, with maps and plans. In 1785 a thirteenth volume followed. Besides Grosier, the Orientalists Deshauterayes and Colson were mainly responsible for the publication.

Translator
Mailla is also the first European scholar to whom we owe a detained knowledge of the Shujing, the classic historical work of the Chinese, most of its books being included in his translation. Mailla, also, in order to promote the work of the mission, compiled some edifying books in Chinese; the most important being lives of the saints, and meditations on the Gospels of the Sundays throughout the whole year.

In Lettres édifiantes there are some letters from him on the persecution of the Christians which took place in China during his time.

Significance
Being based on the Confucian orthodox text of Zhu Xi, Mailla's Histoire générale  gives an idealised account of Chinese imperial history, which should also be read in context of the Rites controversy. For the time being it remained a sole source on Chinese history available in Europe. As a result, eighteenth-century Enlightenment leaders discussed China as an example of an ideal secular monarchy, a biased vision supported by Voltaire and opposed by Montesquieu.

See also

Notes

References
Attribution
 The entry cites:
Lettres edifiantes, Series XXVII (Paris, 1758), lix-lxx;
Biographie universelle, XXVI, 120;
Richthofen, China (1877);
Augustin de Backer & Carlos Sommervogel, V, (1894), 330-34

1669 births
1748 deaths
17th-century French Jesuits
French Roman Catholic missionaries
French translators
French sinologists
Manchurologists
18th-century French Jesuits
French male non-fiction writers
Roman Catholic missionaries in China
Jesuit missionaries
French expatriates in China
Missionary linguists